MS Dwarka was the second of four "modern D Class" passenger/cargo sister ships of the British India Steam Navigation Company (BI). The only one of the quartet to be built by Swan, Hunter & Wigham Richardson at Walker, Newcastle upon Tyne, Dwarka entered service in 1947 on her owners' Persian Gulf local trades. She was named after Dwarka, an ancient city of religious significance in the state of Gujarat, on India's northwest coast.

Of 4,851 gross register tons, 399 feet in length and 55 feet wide, the vessel was powered by a William Doxford & Sons five cylinder opposed piston diesel engine driving a single screw, giving a service speed of 13.5 knots. Original maximum passenger capacity was 1,104 (13 first class, 41 second class and 1,050 deck class), with 122 crew. The quartet were described as "... ships of transport, cargo plus passengers - comfortable but not luxurious, dependable but not speedy - appropriately functional for their time".

Dwarka was the final British-India vessel to operate traditional "liner" trades.

Twice, very close to the end of the vessel's career, Dwarka, under the command of Captain G. A. Hankin, featured on film. In 1979 the BBC made a television documentary as part of the series The World About Us entitled "An Arabian Voyage", about a voyage from Mumbai, stopping at Karachi, taking migrant workers to countries in the Persian Gulf, which illustrated the ship's unique historic status, which reportedly prompted renewed interest in her from around the world. In 1981, Dwarka was used for several location shoots (portraying much earlier BI vessels) in Richard Attenborough's 1982 film Gandhi, about the life of Mahatma Gandhi. 

Dwarka was beached and subsequently scrapped at Gadani Beach, Pakistan, in May 1983. Her sister ship the MS Dumra having been taken out of service in 1979 and also scrapped.

References

External links
 
 

1946 ships
Ships built on the River Tyne
Ships of the British India Steam Navigation Company
Ships built by Swan Hunter